Cossulus turcomanica is a moth in the family Cossidae. It is found in Afghanistan and Turkmenistan.

Subspecies
Cossulus turcomanica turcomanica (Turkmenistan)
Cossulus turcomanica albus (Daniel, 1971) (Afghanistan)

References

Natural History Museum Lepidoptera generic names catalog

Cossinae
Moths described in 1893
Moths of Asia